Anarpia incertalis is a species of moth in the family Crambidae. It is found in France, Spain, Portugal, Italy, Croatia, Bosnia and Herzegovina, Bulgaria, the Republic of Macedonia, Greece and on Corsica, Sardinia, Sicily, Crete and Cyprus, as well as in Iraq, Russia and North Africa, including Morocco.

References

Moths described in 1832
Scopariinae
Moths of Europe
Moths of Asia
Moths of Africa